Kilmessan GAA is a Gaelic Athletic Association club based in Kilmessan, in County Meath, Ireland. The club fields both underage and adult hurling teams. It competes in Meath GAA competitions. Kilmessan are the most successful hurling team in Meath having won the senior championship 29 times.

History
The club was founded in 1902.

Achievements
 Leinster Intermediate Club Hurling Championship Winner 2008
 Meath Senior Hurling Championship: 29 Including 2013
 Meath Senior Football Championship: 3
 Meath Intermediate Hurling Championship Winners 1960  Runners - Up 1997, 1998
 Meath Junior Hurling Championship Winners 1926, 1932, 1972, 1977, 1983, 2008, 2016, 2021  Runner-Up 1959, 1988, 2000, 2007

Notable players
 Nicky Horan
 Stephen Clynch

References

Outside Sources

Gaelic games clubs in County Meath